Stonegate railway station is on the Hastings line in the south of England. It is located between Witherenden Hill and Stonegate in the parish of Ticehurst, East Sussex. It is located  down the line from London Charing Cross . The station and all trains serving it are operated by Southeastern.

Services 
All services at Stonegate are operated by Southeastern using  EMUs.

The typical off-peak service in trains per hour is:
 1 tph to London Charing Cross via 
 1 tph to 

During the peak hours, the station is served by additional services between London Charing Cross and Hastings, increasing the service to 2 tph in each direction.

History 

The station opened the same day named Witherenden (the name of a nearby hamlet), but was renamed in December the same year to Ticehurst Road. It became Stonegate (after a village about 1 mile away) on 16 June 1947.

On 13 April 2014, it emerged that a BlackRock fund manager travelling from the station had dodged an estimated £42,550 over five years in season ticket fares to London by using an unvalidated Oyster card and avoiding ticket inspectors. It is believed to have been the highest fare dodge known in Britain.

References

External links 

Stonegate - at Southeastern

Railway stations in East Sussex
DfT Category E stations
Former South Eastern Railway (UK) stations
Railway stations in Great Britain opened in 1851
Railway stations served by Southeastern
1851 establishments in England
Ticehurst